A Ring mold crater is a kind of crater on the planet Mars that looks like the ring molds used in baking. They are believed to be caused by an impact into ice.  The ice is covered by a layer of debris.  They are found in parts of Mars that have buried ice.  Laboratory experiments confirm that impacts into ice result in a "ring mold shape."  They are also bigger than other craters in which an asteroid impacted solid rock. Impacts into ice warm the ice and cause it to flow into the ring mold shape.  These craters are common in lobate debris aprons and lineated valley fill.  Many have been found in Mamers Valles, a channel found along the dichotomy boundary in Deuteronilus Mensae. They may be an easy way for future colonists of Mars to find water ice.

An modification of the formation of ring mold craters being formed by impact into an ice layer was presented at a Planetary Science conference in Texas in 2018.  This new hypothesis involves mantle layers.

Although cold and dry at present, Mars undergoes major climate changes in which snow and ice are deposited in certain regions.  It has been known for some time that Mars undergoes many large changes in its tilt or obliquity because its two small moons lack the gravity to stabilize it, as the Moon stabilizes Earth; at times the tilt has even been greater than 80 degrees   As a result of these climate changes layers of ice are created that when struck by an asteroid can form ring mold craters.

See also

References

External links 
 Martian Ice - Jim Secosky - 16th Annual International Mars Society Convention

Surface features of Mars